The Young Dudes are an indie rock band from California.

Background
On December 11, 2010 the Limbeck Twitter feed was updated to say "Robb and Patrick have a new band called The Young Dudes." The Young Dudes played their first concert, a house show, with Hellogoodbye in Silver Lake, California on December 10, 2010. Their first single -- "I Got Nothing Cool" -- was released on December 12, 2010 as a free download.

In August 2011, The Young Dudes played two shows in San Francisco at The Fillmore with Motion City Soundtrack.

Singles
I Got Nothing Cool

External links
The Young Dudes Official site
The Young Dudes on Twitter.com

References

Indie rock musical groups from California